Matthew Lucas (born January 29, 1992) is an Australian rugby union footballer. His regular playing position is scrum-half. He has been named in the Waratahs Extended Playing Squad for the 2013 Super Rugby season.

He represented Australia under 20 in both the 2011 and 2012 IRB Junior World Championship.

Relatives
Matt Lucas is the younger brother of rugby player Ben Lucas who plays for Montpellier in the French Top 14 league.

References

External links 
Waratahs profile

1992 births
Australian rugby union players
New South Wales Waratahs players
Male rugby sevens players
Rugby union scrum-halves
Living people
Sydney (NRC team) players
Rugby Calvisano players
ACT Brumbies players
Tokyo Sungoliath players
Black Rams Tokyo players